The 1970 Upper Hunter state by-election was held on 14 February 1970 for the New South Wales Legislative Assembly seat of Upper Hunter. It was triggered by the resignation of Frank O'Keefe to successfully contest the federal seat of Paterson at the 1969 election.

Dates

Results 

Frank O'Keefe resigned to successfully contest the federal seat of Paterson.

See also
Electoral results for the district of Upper Hunter
List of New South Wales state by-elections

References 

1970 elections in Australia
New South Wales state by-elections
1970s in New South Wales
February 1970 events in Australia